Claudio Monteverdi was an Italian composer.

Monteverdi may also refer to:
Monteverdi (automobile), a Swiss automobile brand
Monteverdi (horse), an Irish-trained Thoroughbred racehorse
 Monteverdi (crater), a crater on Mercury

People with the surname
Giulio Cesare Monteverdi, Italian composer, brother of Claudio
Peter Monteverdi, Swiss automaker

See also
The Full Monteverdi (film) 
Monte Verde
Monteverde (disambiguation)
Monteverdi Choir, a choir founded and conducted by John Eliot Gardiner